William H. Muse (June 13, 1814 - January 9, 1855) was an American politician and lawyer. He was the 12th Secretary of State of Mississippi, serving from January 1854 until his death.

Biography 
William H. Muse was born on June 13, 1814, in North Carolina. While young, he moved to Tennessee. Muse attended the University of Nashville, graduating in 1841. He subsequently moved to Huntsville, Alabama. A few years later, he moved to Columbus, Mississippi, and then to Eastport, Mississippi. Muse was a lawyer and a member of the Democratic Party.

Muse was elected to be the Secretary of State of Mississippi in November 1853. His term started in January 1854. Muse died while still in office on January 9, 1855, in Jackson, Mississippi. A. B. Dilworth was appointed to succeed him in the office.

References 

1814 births
1855 deaths
Secretaries of State of Mississippi
People from Tishomingo County, Mississippi
Mississippi lawyers
People from Columbus, Mississippi
University of Nashville alumni
People from Huntsville, Alabama
Mississippi Democrats